Cratoplastis barrosi is a moth of the family Erebidae first described by Romualdo Ferreira d'Almeida in 1968. It is found in French Guiana, Venezuela and the Brazilian state of Amapá.

References

Phaegopterina
Moths of South America
Moths described in 1968